Tahuneh (also Romanized as Ţāḩūneh, Ţāhūneh, and Tāḩūneh; also known as Tahina) is a village in Gel Berenji Rural District, Khafr District, Jahrom County, Fars Province, Iran. At the 2006 census, its population was 486, in 124 families.

References 

Populated places in  Jahrom County